Kamala Kempadoo is a British-Guyanese author and sexology professor who lives in Barbados and Canada. She has written multiple books about sex work and sex trafficking and won awards from the Caribbean Studies Association and the Society for the Scientific Study of Sexuality for her distinguished and lifetime achievement in the sexology field.

Early life and education 
Kempadoo was born in England to Guyanese parents Rosemary Read Kempadoo (part-time writer) and Peter Kempadoo (development worker and writer). She is the second oldest of nine siblings. Her seven sisters include Oonya Kempadoo and Roshini Kempadoo; she has one younger brother.

Kempadoo has master’s degree in Black Studies from Ohio State University, a master's degree and a Ph.D in social sciences from the University of Amsterdam and a Ph.D in sociology from the University of Colorado-Boulder.

Career 
Kempadoo has worked in research since the early 1990s with an initial focus on sexual labour in the Caribbean, before shifting to focus on sex work in general and sex trafficking in low income countries.

She joined York University in 2002, where she later worked as professor to advance the understanding and promote the study of sexology. At York University, she has held academic appointments in political science; gender, feminist and women’s studies; social and political thought; as well as the development studies graduate programmes.

Kempadoo has academic affiliations with the Sir Arthur Lewis Institute of Social and Economic Studies at the University of the West Indies at Cave Hill in Barbados and the Institute for Gender and Development Studies.

In 2018, she was awarded the Society for the Scientific Study of Sexuality's Distinguished Scientific Achievement Award for her contributions to the field of sexology. She was also awarded the Lifetime Achievement Award from the Caribbean Studies Association (CSA) in the same year. The CSA said that Kempadoo is "one of the most important scholars and influential thinkers on the global sex trade, sex work, human trafficking, and sexual-economic relations."

Views 
Kempadoo is proponent for the decriminalisation of sex work and has spoken about how shadism affects the earning potential of sex workers in Curacao.

Personal life 
Kempadoo has previously lived in the UK, Netherlands, United States, and throughout the Caribbean. Since 2002, she lives in Canada during the academic year and in Barbados when not teaching.

Selected publications 

 The white man’s burden revisited, OpenDemocracy, 2015

Books 
 Trafficking and Prostitution Reconsidered, Paradigm, 2005/2012
 Sexing the Caribbean: Gender, Race and Sexual Labour, New York, Routledge, 2004
 Sun, Sex and Gold: Tourism and Sex Work in the Caribbean, Boulder, Colorado, Rowman and Littlefield,1999
 Kamala Kempadoo and Jo Doezema Global Sex Workers: Rights, Resistance and Redefinition, New York, Routledge, 1998
 Kamala Kempadoo, Jyoti Sanghera, and Bandana Pattanaik Trafficking and Prostitution Reconsidered: New Perspectives on Migration, Sex Work, and Human Rights. Boulder, Colorado, Paradigm Publishers, 2005 & 2012

Papers 

 Kamala Kempadoo, Halimah DeShong, and Charmaine Crawford, Caribbean Feminist Research Methods for Gender and Sexuality Studies, Special issue of the Caribbean Review of Gender Studies 7 (Dec 2013) http://sta.uwi.edu/crgs/
 Kamala Kempadoo and Darya Davydova, From Bleeding Hearts to Critical Thinking: Exploring the Issue of Human Trafficking. Toronto Centre for Feminist Research, York University, 2012. http://cfr.info.yorku.ca/fbh/

References 

Living people
Guyanese women writers
Guyanese academics
20th-century English women writers
21st-century English women writers
Academic staff of York University
Ohio State University alumni
University of Amsterdam alumni
University of Colorado Colorado Springs alumni
Year of birth missing (living people)
English people of Guyanese descent
English expatriates in Canada
English expatriates in Barbados